Sir Garfield Edward John Barwick,  (22 June 190313 July 1997) was an Australian judge who was the seventh and longest serving Chief Justice of Australia, in office from 1964 to 1981. He had earlier been a Liberal Party politician, serving as a minister in the Menzies government from 1958 to 1964.

Barwick was born in Sydney, and attended Fort Street High School before going on to study law at the University of Sydney. He was called to the bar in 1927 and became one of Australia's most prominent barristers, appearing in many high-profile cases and frequently before the High Court. He served terms as president of the NSW Bar Association and the Law Council of Australia. Barwick entered politics only at the age of 54, winning election to the House of Representatives at the 1958 Parramatta by-election. Prime Minister Robert Menzies made him Attorney-General by the end of the year, and in 1961 he was additionally made Minister for External Affairs.

In 1964, Menzies nominated Barwick as his choice to replace the retiring Owen Dixon as Chief Justice. Over the next 17 years, the Barwick court decided many significant constitutional cases, including a significant broadening of the corporations power and several cases regarding the constitutional basis of taxation. Barwick also played a small but significant role in the 1975 constitutional crisis, advising Governor-General John Kerr that it was within his powers to dismiss Prime Minister Gough Whitlam from office. He retired from the court at the age of 77, but remained a public figure until his death at the age of 94. Outside of his professional career, he also served as the inaugural president of the Australian Conservation Foundation.

Early life and education
Barwick was one of three brothers born to Methodist parents, of Cornish origin; he was later be very insistent on his Cornish identity. He was raised in Stanmore, an inner-city suburb of Sydney, and attended Fort Street High School. He graduated from the University of Sydney with a University Medal in law.

Legal career
A very diligent student, Barwick was admitted to legal practice soon after finishing university, although (on his own later admission) he suffered severely in financial terms during the Great Depression. He was guarantor for a bank loan to his younger brother to operate a service station in Ashfield, but was unable to repay the bank when the loan was forfeited, and was made bankrupt after he sued the oil companies for defamation. This was held against him by many throughout his career.

Nevertheless, he practised as a barrister from 1927 in many jurisdictions, achieving considerable recognition and the reluctant respect of opponents. At the beginning of World War 2, Barwick's challenges to the National Security Act 1939, which centralised the power to the Australian government, propelled him to the front rank of the Bar.

He became publicly prominent in the 1943 case over the artistic merits of William Dobell's Archibald Prize-winning portrait of the painter Joshua Smith; a losing entrant claimed the picture was caricature, not portraiture. Barwick represented the plaintiff, and although they lost, the judges commended him for the brilliance of his arguments and his name became well known from that point onwards.

Having been briefed in many of Australia's defining constitutional cases (e.g., the Airlines case, and the Bank Nationalisation case), he was knighted in 1953.

A famous example of his astute advocacy involved thirteen Malaysians sentenced to death who appealed to the Privy Council. Twelve retained Barwick, who duly found a technical deficiency in the arrest warrants and secured their freedom. The last, whose counsel was not so thorough, was hanged.

Politics

A member of the Liberal Party, Barwick was elected to the House of Representatives at the 1958 Parramatta by-election, beginning his parliamentary career at the relatively late age of 54. He was re-elected in the general elections of 1958, 1961, and 1963.

After the 1958 election, Barwick was promoted to cabinet as Attorney-General, replacing the retiring Neil O'Sullivan. In that position, he guided through legislation amending the Matrimonial Causes Act and the Crimes Act, and established a model for restrictive trade practices legislation. He also gained public notice for his role in the case of an alleged Estonian war criminal, Ervin Viks, who had settled in Australia and was being pursued by the Soviet Union. Barwick refused to accept the USSR's extradition request, as there was no extradition treaty between the two countries; Viks had passed immigration screening processes and it was argued any such extradition would undermine Australian sovereignty. After the 1961 election, Barwick was additionally made Minister for External Affairs. He led the Australian delegation to the General Assembly of the United Nations for its 15th, 17th, and 18th sessions.

For some time, Barwick was seen as a likely successor to Robert Menzies as Liberal leader and prime minister. When the news broke that he was entering parliament, Frank Browne confidently wrote:

However, Barwick struggled to adapt to the cut and thrust of political life. There were reports that he was reduced to tears by a vitriolic debate over what became the Crimes Act 1959, which he later confirmed had been accurate. In retirement, Menzies said that he "didn't understand parliament [...] he was a disappointing politician". An opinion poll in 1960 found that only three percent of the general public supported him as Menzies' replacement. He had little support from other Liberal MPs, and speculation about his leadership prospects was largely media-driven. Barwick's elevation to the High Court further "cleared the space" for Harold Holt, the deputy leader, and he eventually replaced Menzies as leader unopposed in 1966.

Chief Justice

On 27 April 1964, Barwick was appointed Chief Justice of the High Court of Australia, succeeding Sir Owen Dixon, being the first law graduate from the University of Sydney to hold the position. He was instrumental in the construction of the High Court building in Canberra (unofficially known, as a result, as "Gar's Mahal"), and became the first president of the Australian Conservation Foundation in 1966.

Barwick was one of only eight justices of the High Court to have served in the Parliament of Australia prior to his appointment to the Court; the others were Edmund Barton, Richard O'Connor, Isaac Isaacs, H. B. Higgins, Edward McTiernan, John Latham, and Lionel Murphy.

In 1972, he became President of the Australian Institute for International Affairs. He was an ad hoc judge of the International Court of Justice in 1973–74 in the Nuclear Tests (Australia v. France) and Nuclear Tests (New Zealand v. France) cases, representing Australia and New Zealand jointly.

A significant decision of the Barwick court marked the beginning of the modern interpretation of the corporations power, which had been interpreted narrowly since 1909. The Concrete Pipes case (1971) established that the federal parliament could exercise the power to regulate at least the trading activities of corporations, whereas earlier interpretations had allowed only the regulation of conduct or transactions with the public.

The court decided many other significant constitutional cases, including the Seas and Submerged Lands case (1975), upholding legislation asserting sovereignty over the territorial sea; the First (1975) and Second (1977) Territory Senators cases, which concerned whether legislation allowing for the mainland territories to be represented in the Parliament of Australia was valid; and Russell v Russell (1976), which concerned the validity of the Family Law Act 1975. The court also decided several cases relating to the historic 1974 joint sitting of the Parliament of Australia, including Cormack v Cope (1974) and the Petroleum and Minerals Authority case (1975).

The Barwick court decided several infamous cases on tax avoidance and tax evasion, almost always deciding against the taxation office. Led by Barwick himself in most judgments, the court distinguished between avoidance (legitimately minimising one's tax obligations) and evasion (illegally evading obligations). The decisions effectively nullified the anti-avoidance legislation and led to the proliferation of avoidance schemes in the 1970s, a result which drew much criticism upon the court.

During the 1975 Australian constitutional crisis, he controversially advised Governor-General Sir John Kerr on the constitutional legality of dismissing a prime minister who declined to advise an election when unable to obtain passage of supply. That was significant, because Barwick and Gough Whitlam, whose government Kerr dismissed, had a history of antipathy dating from the mid-1950s. Further, Whitlam had refused Kerr's request for permission to consult Barwick, or to act on any advice except his own.

The High Court was due to move to new premises in Canberra in May 1980. A year earlier, in anticipation of the move, Barwick wrote to Malcolm Fraser (who had become prime minister as a result of the dismissal and who was confirmed in office by the December 1975 election), seeking an official residence in the national capital. His request "went down like a lead balloon with the cabinet which had run into trouble with the High Court's burgeoning costs while urging economic restraint on other Australians", and was rejected. The $46.5 million High Court building in Canberra was opened by the Queen in May 1980, and is today still referred to as "Gar's Mahal".

Barwick retired from the bench in 1981, a few months after passing Sir John Latham's record as the longest-serving Chief Justice. He retained excellent health and continued to be active as a much-sought-after expert on legal issues until the end of his life. His writings included Sir John Did His Duty (a commentary on Kerr's dismissal of Whitlam) and his 1995 memoir A Radical Tory.

Privy Council

Barwick was appointed a Privy Counsellor in 1964 and sat as a member of the Judicial Committee of the Privy Council on 22 occasions, between 1966, and 1980. Barwick insisted on an amendment to Privy Council procedure to allow dissent, however he exercised that only once.  The appeals mostly related to decisions from other Commonwealth countries, although they occasionally included appeals from a State Supreme Court.

Barwick supported the passage of the Privy Council (Limitation of Appeals) Act 1968, which closed off appeals from the High Court to the Judicial Committee of the Privy Council. He said that "Australia needed to make its own legal mistakes". However, it remained possible to appeal to the Privy Council from state supreme courts until the passage of the Australia Act 1986.

Personal life
In 1929, Barwick married Norma Symons, with whom he had one son and one daughter.

He was the double cousin of Robert Ellicott, also an Attorney-General, and later Justice of the Federal Court of Australia, and who like Barwick attended Fort Street and Sydney University. On 13 July 1997, aged 94, Barwick died. He was cremated and his ashes interred at Northern Suburbs Memorial Gardens.

Honours
In June 1953, he was made a Knight Bachelor, "in recognition of service to the Public service".

In January 1965, he was appointed a Knight Grand Cross of the Order of St Michael and St George (GCMG), honouring his contribution as Chief Justice of the High Court.

In June 1981, he was appointed a Knight of the Order of Australia (AK), "in recognition of service to the Australian Parliament, government and the law".

References

Bibliography

External links
 Attorney-General’s Department (Commonwealth of Australia) Sir Garfield Barwick

1903 births
1997 deaths
Attorneys-General of Australia
1975 Australian constitutional crisis
Australian ministers for Foreign Affairs
Australian people of Cornish descent
Australian King's Counsel
Chief justices of Australia
Justices of the High Court of Australia
Knights of the Order of Australia
Australian Knights Grand Cross of the Order of St Michael and St George
Australian Knights Bachelor
Australian politicians awarded knighthoods
Liberal Party of Australia members of the Parliament of Australia
Members of the Australian House of Representatives for Parramatta
Members of the Australian House of Representatives
Australian members of the Privy Council of the United Kingdom
Members of the Judicial Committee of the Privy Council
People educated at Fort Street High School
Sydney Law School alumni
20th-century Australian lawyers
Chancellors of Macquarie University
20th-century Australian politicians
Australian memoirists
20th-century memoirists
Lawyers from Sydney